Gavanlu (also Romanized as Gavanlū) is a village in Owch Tappeh-ye Sharqi Rural District of the Central District of Mianeh County, East Azerbaijan province, Iran. At the 2006 National Census, its population was 539 in 118 households. The following census in 2011 counted 402 people in 97 households. The latest census in 2016 showed a population of 337 people in 100 households; it was the largest village in its rural district.

References 

Meyaneh County

Populated places in East Azerbaijan Province

Populated places in Meyaneh County